Reales Tamarindos Airport  is a closed airport formerly serving Portoviejo, the capital of Manabí Province in Ecuador.

The nearest major airport to Portoviejo is Eloy Alfaro International Airport in Manta,  to the west.

Following the April 2016 earthquake, a tent settlement was set up on the closed runway to provide shelter for displaced households.

See also
Transport in Ecuador
List of airports in Ecuador

References

External links
OpenStreetMap - Portoviejo

Defunct airports in Ecuador
Airports in Ecuador
Buildings and structures in Manabí Province